Nastel Technologies is an information technology (IT) monitoring company that sells software for Artificial Intelligent IT Operations (AIOps), monitoring and managing middleware, transaction tracking and tracing, IT Operational Analytics (ITOA), Decision Support Systems (DSS) business transaction management (BTM) and application performance management (APM).

History
Nastel Technologies was founded in 1994 by David Mavashev to provide a solution for monitoring and administration of messaging middleware technologies. Nastel has since broadened its coverage, based on a complex event processing ("CEP") engine, to support the five dimensions of APM defined by the Gartner Group, including coverage for: Java, .NET, CICS, Web Services and other technologies and to handle the integration of its monitoring technology with a typical Forbes Global 2000 company’s existing IT monitoring software. Nastel AutoPilot has been especially effective in the banking industry, insurance, healthcare and retail.

Products
Nastel Technologies’ delivers three main products Nastel AutoPilot, Nastel Navigator and Nastel XRay.

Nastel AutoPilot is software for real-time monitoring of the availability and performance of business applications. Using complex event processing and business transaction management it provides real-time visibility of applications, middleware and transactions, as well as predictive alerting.

Nastel Navigator provides Middleware management for a multitude of different middleware platforms including IBM (WebSphere MQ), TIBCO, and Kafka. Allowing for daily management functions to be delivered simply and securely, including migrations, queue management, upgrades, and updates, as well as allowing middleware operators to setup secure methods for middleware users to manage their own queues.

Nastel XRay is a machine-data analytics platform that encompasses a broad array of machine learning algorithms to deliver predictive analysis and automation that helps IT and the business operate more effectively.

In Feb. 2023, it was announced that Nastel Technologies has received investment from Software Growth Partners (SGP) and rebranded as meshIQ to expand the company's focus on delivering an observability platform for integration MESH (Messaging, Event Processing, Streaming platforms deployed across Hybrid cloud).

See also 
 AppDynamics
 AppNeta
 CA, Inc.
 Computer Associates
 Dynatrace 
 Instana
 New Relic
 Riverbed Technology
 Splunk

References

External links
 Forrester Research: Evaluating Innovative I&O Solutions: Converged Application Performance Management

Software companies based in New York (state)
Software companies of the United States